Chamberlain's dwarf salamander (Eurycea chamberlaini) is a species of salamander in the family Plethodontidae,  endemic to the United States. Its natural habitats are temperate forests, rivers, and freshwater marshes.

It is only found in the states of North Carolina and South Carolina. It was previously thought to be a color morph of the southeastern dwarf salamander (Eurycea quadridigitata), but was described in 2003 as a distinct species based on distinct morphology and behavior. A 2017 study reaffirmed it as being a distinct species.

It was named after Edward Burnham Chamberlain, a former curator of the Vertebrate Zoology department at the Charleston Museum.

References

Amphibians of the United States
Eurycea
Taxonomy articles created by Polbot
Amphibians described in 2003